Jody W. Deming (born July 2, 1952) is an American oceanographer. She is a professor of Oceanography and a marine microbiologist at the University of Washington (UW). Her research interests include studies of cold adapted microbes in their relation to astrobiology, biotechnology, and bioremediation. She is known for her extensive field work, being involved in over 50 nautical research expeditions. Deming is also the cofounder of the UW Astrobiology Extremophile Laboratory.

Education
Deming graduated cum laude from Smith College in Massachusetts in 1974 with a Bachelors in Biological Sciences specializing in Botany. She was also awarded a Smith College Piano Scholarship during her undergraduate career. In 1981, Deming received her PhD in Microbiology at the University of Maryland with Rita Colwell as her thesis advisor.

Career 
In 1970's, Deming developed microbial detection systems for unusual habitats for NASA.

Deming is a professor and researcher at University of Washington.
Deming is the Editor-in-chief of Elementa's Ocean Science.

Research 
Deming's research primarily involves the study of cold-adapted microbes gathered from Arctic sea ice samples. The bacterium Colwellia demingiae (type strain ACAM 459) is named after her. Cold-adapted microbial life has been a research topic of astrobiologists searching for life on Europa and Mars, due to similar cold climates. As such, Deming's research has been used as a reference for institutions such as NASA for what life may be like on Europa and Mars.

Presentations 
2008 Earth's Low Temperature Life: An Analog for Mars and Europa? (March 31, 2008).
2016 Life in Ice: Informing the Search on Other Ocean World (May 17, 2016).

Awards 
1993 US Coast Guard Arctic Service Medal
2003 U.S. National Academy of Sciences
2018 National Academies Keck Futures Initiative (NAKFI) Challenge Award

See also 
 Colwellia demingiae
Frost flower (sea ice)

References

External links 
Jody Deming profile at University of Washington, School of Oceanography
 Why is Elementa important for Ocean Scientists? Jody Deming explains. Jan 31, 2013.
Discovering the Deep Blue Sea. Jody Deming, The Deep Memory Project.
Suddenly There's A Meadow In the Ocean With 'Flowers' Everywhere (December 18, 2012 NPR)

1952 births
Living people
American oceanographers
University of Washington faculty
Smith College alumni
University of Maryland, College Park alumni